Wilfried Klingbiel (born June 21, 1939) is a German former footballer.

External links
Profile at DFB
List of DDR internationals

1939 births
Living people
German footballers
East German footballers
East Germany international footballers
Berliner FC Dynamo players
1. FC Magdeburg players
Eisenhüttenstädter FC Stahl players
DDR-Oberliga players
Association football forwards
People from Stendal
Footballers from Saxony-Anhalt